The men's 400 metres hurdles event at the 2017 European Athletics U23 Championships was held in Bydgoszcz, Poland, at Zdzisław Krzyszkowiak Stadium on 14, 15 and 16 July.

Medalists

Records
Prior to the competition, the records were as follows:

Results

Heats
14 July

Qualification rule: First 3 (Q) and the next 4 fastest (q) qualified for the semifinals.

Semifinals
15 July

Qualification rule: First 3 (Q) and the next 2 fastest (q) qualified for the final.

Final
16 July

References

400 metres hurdles
400 metres hurdles at the European Athletics U23 Championships